The Kent State Golden Flashes are the athletic teams that represent Kent State University. The university fields 19 varsity athletic teams in the National Collegiate Athletic Association (NCAA) at the Division I level with football competing in the Football Bowl Subdivision.  Kent State is a full member of the Mid-American Conference (MAC) and has been part of the MAC East division since it was created in 1998. Official school colors are Kent State Blue and Kent State Gold.

Athletic events were held during the very first semester at Kent State in late 1913, with several intramural teams for female students and a limited number of opportunities for male students. Early men's athletic events, in basketball and baseball, were played against local high school, church, and company teams.  The first intercollegiate athletic event, a men's basketball game, was held in January 1915 and the baseball team held their first intercollegiate game later that year. A dedicated athletic field was built around 1920 and the school's first gymnasium opened in 1925. Football also debuted as a sport in 1920, followed by wrestling, men's tennis, men's gymnastics, and men's swimming. From 1932 to 1951, Kent State competed as a member of the Ohio Athletic Conference before joining the Mid-American Conference in 1951. The school's first permanent football stadium and a new basketball gym opened in 1950.

Although women's intramural athletics had been part of the university since it was first established, the first women's intercollegiate athletic team was not established until 1964 when the women's gymnastics team, the first women's collegiate gymnastics team in the U.S., began intercollegiate competition after being founded in 1959. Additional women's sports, including swimming, field hockey, basketball, and volleyball, were added as varsity sports in the mid-1970s following the passage and implementation of Title IX. Budget constraints and other factors led to the university dropping swimming, tennis, ice hockey, and men's soccer during the 1980s and 1990s, with ice hockey becoming a club-level sport in the American Collegiate Hockey Association (ACHA) Division I as part of College Hockey Mid-America (CHMA). The most recent changes occurred in the late 1990s when women's golf and women's soccer were added as varsity sports, followed by the addition of women's lacrosse, which began play in 2019.

Several Kent State athletic teams have enjoyed success in the Mid-American Conference and at the national level over the years and the university has produced individual national champions in both wrestling and track and field. Both the men's and women's golf teams have been the most successful in MAC play having won the most conference titles in MAC history through 2017. The men's golf team has also finished as high as 5th nationally in 2012 to go with 6th and 9th-place finishes, while the women's golf team also claimed a 5th place finish in 2017. Additionally, the men's basketball team made a notable run to the Elite Eight in 2002, the baseball team advanced to the College World Series in 2012, and the softball team qualified for the Women's College World Series in 1990. Kent State also has had high national finishes from the men's indoor and outdoor track and field teams, women's gymnastics, and wrestling. A number of Golden Flashes alumni have gone on to play and coach in both college and major professional sports, such as Jack Lambert, Antonio Gates, Nick Saban, Lou Holtz, Thurmon Munson, and Emmanuel Burriss.

History

Athletics at Kent State began shortly after the school was first organized in 1910 and the first classes held in 1912.  The school's first sporting event was a men's basketball game in 1913 against Kent High School and the following spring (1914) the baseball team was organized, known as the "Normal Nine".  The football team followed in 1920 and held their first game on October 30, a 6–0 loss to Ashland College.  Around this same time, the teams became known as the "Silver Foxes" because then-president John Edward McGilvrey raised silver foxes on his farm east of campus.  After McGilvrey's controversial firing in 1926, the new administration held a contest to choose a different team name and "Golden Flashes" was chosen, though no significance was included in the name.  The first use of "Golden Flashes" occurred in 1927 after it was approved by the student body and faculty athletic committee. The school colors are officially defined as "Kent State blue" and "Kent State gold", which are shades of Navy blue and gold.  The original school colors, as chosen by the school's first president John Edward McGilvrey, were orange and blue, believed to have been inspired by the school colors for the University of Illinois at Urbana–Champaign, where McGilvrey had been a professor.  Gold was also used with blue during the 1920s.  A committee formally set the colors as royal blue and gold in 1925. Kent State was a member of the Ohio Athletic Conference from 1932 to 1951 and joined the Mid-American Conference in 1951.

National placements
Although no Kent State team has won a national title in any sport, several Golden Flashes teams have placed highly in NCAA national tournaments.  Notable national finishes include:
 Men's basketball: tie-5th (2002)
 Men's golf: 9th (2000); 6th (2008); tie-5th (2012)
 Men's indoor track and field: 5th (1972), 2nd (1973)
 Men's outdoor track and field: 6th (1972 and 1973)
 Baseball: tie-5th (2012) (CWS Appearance)
 Gymnastics:12th (2011) 1st MAC Team to ever qualify for the National Championships
 Softball: 7th (1990)
 Wrestling: 5th (1941 and 1942)
Co-ed cheerleading: 8th (2008); 9th (2009)

Sports sponsored 

Kent State sponsors 19 athletic teams at the NCAA Division I level, with eight for men and 11 for women. All current teams compete in the Mid-American Conference. The academic year is divided into three seasons, with the fall sports season typically lasting from August into December, the winter sports season going from late November into March, and the spring sports season beginning in early March and ending in June. Fall sports are football, women's field hockey, women's soccer, women's volleyball, men's and women's golf, and men's and women's cross country. During the winter sports season, Kent State has men's and women's basketball, women's gymnastics, wrestling, and men's and women's indoor track and field. The spring sports season features men's and women's golf, baseball, women's lacrosse, softball, and men's and women's outdoor track & field. Both men's and women's golf compete in tournaments around the country in both the fall and spring seasons, with MAC and NCAA championship play held in the spring season.

Baseball

The baseball team is Kent State's second oldest sport, though it is the school's oldest intercollegiate team.  Formed in 1914, they were known originally as the "Normal Nine" as the school was originally known as Kent State Normal School.  The team has enjoyed significant success both in the Mid-American Conference and on the national level and has sent several players to the major leagues over the years.  The team's home field is Olga Mural Field at Schoonover Stadium, opened in 2005 on the site of the team's previous home, Gene Michael Field.  The coach is Jeff Duncan, who was hired as coach after the 2013 season. Through the 2018 season, the team has 12 MAC East titles, 15 MAC regular-season titles, 11 MAC tournament titles, and 13 NCAA tournament appearances.  In 2012, the team made its first appearances in both the Super Regional round of the NCAA baseball tournament and the College World Series.  
MAC East division titles: 2000, 2003, 2006, 2007, 2008, 2010, 2011, 2012, 2013, 2015, 2016, 2017
MAC overall titles: 1964, 1992, 1993, 1994, 1996, 2001, 2002, 2003, 2006, 2008, 2011, 2012, 2016, 2017, 2018
MAC tournament titles: 1992, 1993, 2001, 2002, 2004, 2007, 2009, 2010, 2011, 2012, 2014
NCAA Tournament appearances: 1964, 1992, 1993, 1994, 2001, 2002, 2004, 2007, 2009, 2010, 2011, 2012, 2014
College World Series appearances: 2012

Men's basketball

The men's basketball team, which began play in 1913 and intercollegiate competition in 1914, plays in the Memorial Athletic and Convocation Center and is Kent State's oldest sport and second-oldest intercollegiate team.  After decades of near anonymity, since 1998 the team has been one of the most consistent in the Mid-American Conference with a league record ten straight twenty-win seasons from the 1998–99 season through the 2007–08 season (the previous record was five straight).  Kent State was one of only eight NCAA Division I men's basketball programs in the United States to have ten consecutive seasons with twenty or more wins.  Kent State also holds the MAC record for consecutive seasons with double-digit conference wins, also for ten consecutive seasons (the previous record was eight straight), and in 2002 finished 17–1 in conference play, setting a MAC record for conference wins in a season. The Flashes amassed thirty victories in the 2001–02 season which culminated in a berth in the NCAA Elite Eight. In the tournament they defeated seventh-seeded Oklahoma State, second-seeded Alabama, and third-seeded Pitt. One of the stars on this team, power forward Antonio Gates, went on to become a superstar tight end with the San Diego/Los Angeles Chargers. Kent State has made 12 MAC tournament title game appearances (most in conference history) and has won six (second most), along with six regular-season MAC titles and nine MAC East titles.
MAC East division titles: 2001, 2002, 2003, 2004, 2006, 2008, 2010, 2011, 2015
MAC overall titles: 2002, 2006, 2008, 2010, 2011, 2015
MAC Tournament titles: 1999, 2001, 2002, 2006, 2008, 2017
NCAA tournament appearances: 1999, 2001, 2002, 2006, 2008, 2017
NIT appearances: 1985, 1989, 1990, 2000, 2003, 2004, 2005, 2010

Women's basketball

The women's basketball team, which began play during the 1975–1976 season, also plays home games at the Memorial Athletic and Convocation Center.  Currently, they are coached by Bob Lindsay, who has been with Kent State for 21 seasons as of 2009–2010.  They have seven MAC East titles, six MAC overall titles, and four MAC tournament titles.  In addition, they have five NCAA tournament appearances, the most recent being in 2002, and one WNIT appearance.  Kent State has appeared in eleven MAC Tournament championship games (tied for most appearances with Toledo), including seven in a row from 1996–2002.  In fact, the 1996–2001 MAC title games all featured Kent State vs. Toledo.  In 1998, Kent State became one of only two MAC schools (Bowling Green being the other) to complete the regular season and tournament with a perfect record, going 18-0 in the regular season and winning the conference tournament.  Prior to the start of the 2009–2010 season, Kent State had an overall record of 535-387 and a MAC record of 280-179.

MAC East division titles: 1998, 1999, 2000, 2001, 2002, 2005, 2006
MAC overall titles: 1981, 1996, 1998, 1999, 2000, 2002
MAC Tournament titles: 1981, 1998, 2000, 2002
NCAA Tournament appearances: 1982, 1996, 1998, 2000, 2002
WNIT appearances: 2004

Field hockey

The field hockey team plays its home matches at Murphy-Mellis Field, which opened in 2005 and is adjacent to Dix Stadium.  The team has won 14 MAC titles, with the most recent in 2016, and has 12 MAC tournament titles and NCAA appearances, the most recent being in 2016.  In 2001, Kent State hosted the NCAA Division I Field Hockey Championship at Dix Stadium, where they played their home games from 1997 through 2004.
MAC titles: 1988, 1991, 1992, 1999, 2000, 2003, 2004, 2005, 2008, 2009, 2010, 2014, 2015, 2016
MAC tournament titles: 1988, 1991, 1992, 1998, 1999, 2000, 2002, 2008, 2010, 2014, 2015, 2016
NCAA tournament appearances: 1988, 1991, 1992, 1998, 1999, 2000, 2002, 2008, 2010, 2014, 2015, 2016

Football

The Golden Flashes football team plays in the NCAA's Division I Football Bowl Subdivision.  Home games are played at Dix Stadium on the far eastern edge of the Kent State campus.  Since 2018, the head coach is Sean Lewis.  Behind Dix Stadium are practice fields, as well as the Kent State Field House, which contains a full indoor football field.

Kent State has four post-season bowl game appearances: the 1954 Refrigerator Bowl, 1972 Tangerine Bowl, 2013 GoDaddy.com Bowl, and 2019 Frisco Bowl. After falling in their previous three bowl game appearances, the 2019 Frisco Bowl was the program's first bowl game victory, a 51–41 win over Utah State.
 
Although the team has not enjoyed many winning seasons, Kent State has sent a fair number of players to the ranks of the National Football League as well as in other areas of college football.  Don James coached the team from 1971–1974 during the era which also saw future NFL great Jack Lambert and current Alabama head coach Nick Saban playing for the Golden Flashes and Kent State's only Mid-American Conference championship in 1972.  Some of the NFL players who played football at Kent State include Dri Archer, Joshua Cribbs, Julian Edelman, and James Harrison.  In addition, Antonio Gates, who played for the KSU men's basketball team, played in the NFL for 16 seasons.  Other notable football alumni and former coaches include current ESPN analyst and former Notre Dame and South Carolina head coach Lou Holtz, former Houston Texans head coach and current Green Bay Packers defensive coordinator Dom Capers (graduate assistant at Kent State), former Toronto Argonauts standout Jim Corrigall (who also served as head coach at KSU) and Gary Pinkel, head coach of the Missouri Tigers from 2001 to 2015.
MAC overall titles: 1972
MAC East Division titles: 2012, 2021
Bowl appearances: 1954, 1972, 2012, 2019, 2021
Bowl wins: 2019

Men's golf

The men's golf team has had success both in the Mid-American Conference and at the national level, winning 28 MAC titles and making 36 appearances in the NCAA tournament, including 23 trips to the championship round and three regional championships, as of 2022. They practice at Windmill Lakes Golf Club in nearby Ravenna, where they occasionally host matches.  The program has produced several pro-golfers and in 2003, former Golden Flashes standout Ben Curtis won the British Open in what ABC commentator Mike Tirico called "one of the most amazing stories in the history of the Open Championship" and the "all-time Cinderella story." The team is coached by Jon Mills, a Kent State alum who has been head coach since 2019. He succeeded Herb Page, a KSU alum who coached from 1978 to 2019. Page led the Flashes to 21 of their 24 MAC titles, their three regional titles, and 26 of their 28 trips to NCAA competition.  In 2008, he coached Kent State to its highest finish ever at the national level, finishing 6th in the country at the NCAA championship as well as a ninth-place NCAA finish in 2000. Page has been named MAC Coach of the Year 20 times through 2017 and NCAA district IV Coach of the Year eight times.

In mid–2007, Kent State opened the Ferrara and Page Golf Training and Learning Facility located in Franklin Township adjacent to the former Kent State Golf Course. The facility includes a 350-yard outdoor practice range, outdoor practice tees, and outdoor short-game practice areas as well as an indoor putting and chipping area, a video analysis room, and a science and motion putt lab. In addition, the rear of the facility features heated stalls which allow team members to access the driving range even during the winter months to provide year-round training for both the men's and women's teams.

Ohio Athletic Conference titles: 1934, 1950
MAC titles: 1954^, 1968, 1977, 1984, 1992^, 1993, 1994, 1995, 1997, 1998, 1999, 2000, 2001, 2003, 2005, 2006, 2009, 2010, 2011, 2012, 2013, 2014, 2016, 2017, 2018, 2019, 2021, 2022
NCAA appearances: 1947*, 1949*, 1951*, 1954*, 1977, 1984*, 1987*, 1989, 1990*, 1991, 1992*, 1993*, 1994*, 1995*, 1996, 1998*, 1999, 2000*, 2001*, 2003, 2004*, 2005, 2006, 2008*, 2009, 2010*, 2011*, 2012*, 2013*, 2014, 2016, 2017*, 2018*, 2019, 2021, 2022
NCAA regional titles: 1993, 2001, 2010
^=co-champions
*= advanced to championship round

Women's golf

The women's golf team, founded in late 1998, has enjoyed success from its beginning.  Every year of the program's existence it has won the Mid-American Conference title and is so far the only school to win the Mid-American Conference Women's Golf Championships, which began in April 1999. Through 2022, they have advanced to NCAA play for 21 consecutive seasons, reaching the championship round in five of them. In 2017 and 2018, the Flashes finished in a tie for fifth nationally, their highest finish to date, after advancing to match play in the NCAA Division I Women's Golf Championships. while 2008 saw the Flashes win two regular-season tournaments, gain a national ranking of thirteenth, and win their tenth consecutive MAC title by 51 strokes. Their 18th consecutive MAC championship in 2016 set the conference record for most consecutive championships in a sport.

Along with the men's team, they practice at Windmill Lakes Golf Course in Ravenna and the Ferrara and Page Golf Training and Learning Facility in Franklin Township.  The team is coached by Casey VanDamme, who began his tenure in August 2021 as the program's fourth head coach. 

MAC titles: 1999, 2000, 2001, 2002, 2003, 2004, 2005, 2006, 2007, 2008, 2009, 2010, 2011, 2012, 2013, 2014, 2015, 2016, 2017, 2018, 2019, 2021, 2022
NCAA appearances: 2001*, 2002, 2003*, 2004, 2005, 2006*, 2007, 2008, 2009, 2010*, 2011, 2012, 2013, 2014, 2015, 2016, 2017*, 2018*, 2019, 2021, 2022
*= advanced to championship round

Women's gymnastics

First developed in 1959, the Kent State women's gymnastics team was the first women's gymnastics team at the collegiate level. They began intercollegiate competition in 1964 and Mid-American Conference competition in 1981 and have enjoyed consistent success throughout their existence, which includes 11 Mid-American Conference meet championships and 14 regular-season titles. Home meets are held in the MAC Center and the team practices in the MAC Gymnastics Center, an annex on the north side of the building which opened in 1979.  The current coach is Brice Biggin, a Kent State alum of the men's gymnastics team who has been coach since 1992. Through the 2013 regular season, he has a record of 342-209 at Kent State.

Ohio state championships*: 1975, 1976, 1977, 1978
MAC regular-season titles: 1981, 1984, 1988, 1989, 1994, 1996, 1997, 2001, 2006, 2007, 2008, 2009, 2010, 2013
MAC championships: 1981, 1984, 1988, 1989, 1994, 1996, 1997, 2001, 2005, 2008, 2009, 2015
 
* the Ohio state championship was held prior to the Mid-American Conference adding gymnastics as a sport.  Occasionally the three remaining Division I teams in Ohio will hold the "All-Ohio Meet".

Softball

The softball team plays its home games at the Judith K. Devine Diamond, adjacent to Dix Stadium. The team has won six regular season MAC titles and 10 MAC East Division titles, the most recent in 2016, and three MAC Tournament championships, with the most recent in 2017.  In 1990, the team went 43–9 en route to their first MAC title, an NCAA regional championship, and a berth in the Women's College World Series. The head coach since August 2015 is Eric Oakley, who came to the program in 2014 as an assistant. The team was established in 1976 and began regular-season play in the Mid-American Conference in 1982 when the MAC added softball as a conference sport.

MAC East division titles: 1999, 2004, 2006, 2007, 2008, 2009, 2010, 2013, 2015, 2016
MAC regular-season titles: 1990, 2007, 2008, 2010, 2015, 2016
MAC tournament titles: 2006, 2008, 2017
NCAA tournament appearances: 1990, 2006, 2008, 2017
NCAA regional titles: 1990

Wrestling

The wrestling team is one of Kent State's oldest sports, going back to its establishment in 1927.   It has historically been one of the school's most successful teams, winning multiple conference titles and making a series of appearances in the NCAA tournament, finishing as high as 5th nationally in both 1941 and 1942.  For 42 seasons, the team was led by legendary coach Joseph Begala, who compiled a career record of 307-69-5 and the national reputation as the "winningest wrestling coach" coaching Kent State from 1929–1942 and again from 1945 until his retirement in 1971. The team has its home meets at the Memorial Athletic and Convocation Center, its home venue since 1950.  More recently, the Flashes have again received national attention appearing in the national top-25 rankings in each of the past three seasons and began the 2008–2009 season ranked 23rd.  The wrestling team is currently led by head coach and Kent State alum Jim Andrassy, who has been with the team as a wrestler, graduate assistant, and  assistant coach since 1990 and as head coach since 2003.
In 2011, Kent State had its first national champion with Dustin Kilgore at the 197-pound class.

MAC regular-season titles: 1958, 1977, 1979, 1980, 1981, 1982, 1988, 1989, 1990, 2003, 2009
MAC tournament titles: 1958, 1977, 1978, 1979, 1980, 1981, 1982, 1988, 1989, 1990
NCAA tournament appearances: 1939, 1940, 1941, 1942, 1946, 1954, 1959, 1960, 1971, 1978, 1981, 1985

Former teams
Additionally, Kent State used to sponsor the following sports, which were eliminated over the years largely due to budget constraints:
Ice hockey (now a club sport); 1980–1994
Men's gymnastics; 1949–1951, 1970–1994
Men's soccer; 1965–1981 
Men's swimming and diving; 1936–1988
Women's swimming and diving; 1962–1988
Men's tennis; 1931–1982
Women's tennis; 1976–1982

Facilities

Rivalries

The earliest athletic meeting between the two schools is a men's basketball game on February 19, 1916, in Kent, followed by a baseball game later that year, also in Kent. The two schools first met in football in 1923. They were conference rivals as members of the Ohio Athletic Conference from 1932–1936 and again from 1944–1951. Kent State joined the Mid-American Conference in 1951 and Akron joined the MAC in 1992 after transitioning to Division I-A in football. The Flashes compete with the Zips in softball, men's and women's basketball, men's and women's indoor and outdoor track and field, men's and women's cross country, men's and women's golf, women's soccer, and women's volleyball.

Since 1946, the two football teams have competed for the Wagon Wheel trophy. Through the 2015 meeting, Akron leads the overall series in football 32–24–2, but Kent State leads the series since the Wagon Wheel was contested, 23–21–1. The rivalry in men's basketball is an even closer series with Kent State leading the Zips 72–71 through the 2015–16 season. Since the late 1990s, both teams have been consistent contenders for the MAC East, MAC, and MAC Tournament titles, so games between the two often have implications in the conference standings or in the tournament. Since Akron's first MAC East title in 1998, the two teams have combined for eight MAC Tournament championships, eight MAC regular-season championships, and 13 MAC East division titles.

In 2011, the two schools created the Wagon Wheel Challenge, which counts all athletic contests in the 15 sports where they compete head-to-head. Through a sponsorship agreement with PNC Financial Services it is known as the "PNC Wagon Wheel Challenge". Each sport is worth one point, awarded to the winning team. In sports with multiple meetings per season, whichever team wins the most games takes the full point. If the teams split the season's meetings, each school gets a half-point. For sports that only compete against each other as part of the conference championship meet, such as cross country, golf, and track and field, whichever team finishes higher in the championship meet is awarded the point. Games in the respective conference tournaments can also factor in to which school receives the point if the teams split their regular-season meetings, with the conference tournament meeting acting as a deciding game. Kent State took the first four seasons of the challenge, while the Zips claimed the overall challenge in 2015–16.

Kent State also has a long-standing rivalry with the Bowling Green Falcons from Bowling Green State University in Bowling Green, Ohio. The two are sister schools, created together by the Lowry Bill in 1910, and both have been members of the Mid-American Conference since Bowling Green joined in 1952, the season after Kent State. While both schools have primary rivals in their immediate geographic regions, the two football teams play annually for the Anniversary Award and during the 2009–10 season both schools competed for the Centennial Cup to celebrate the respective centennial anniversaries of each school. Points were awarded for every head-to-head matchup in the 14 sports offered at both schools. Kent State won the cup 13.5–7.5.

Outside the Mid-American Conference, Kent State has established rivalries with the two other NCAA Division I programs in Northeast Ohio, the Cleveland State Vikings from Cleveland State University, and the Youngstown State Penguins from Youngstown State University, both members of the Horizon League. The Flashes and Vikings regularly meet in men's and women's basketball, wrestling, and softball, and previously had a long-standing series in baseball until the CSU baseball program was eliminated in 2011. Kent State and Youngstown State play regularly in men's and women's basketball, baseball, and softball, and have played periodically in football, where YSU competes in the Football Championship Subdivision (FCS). Through 2014, the teams have played 10 times with the last meeting being in 2003.

Mascot 
Flash, a golden eagle, is the mascot for the Golden Flashes. He was first created in 1985, and the current costume was designed in 1994. The first mascot was a golden retriever named Golden Flasher I, who held the position in 1955 but had to retire after a bone disease. A new retriever named Golden Flasher II was suggested but never became official. It was not until 1968 that Grog, a caveman from the comic B.C. found a place as Kent State's mascot. The mascot was short-lived, however, as it was retired in 1974. In 1971 through 1974, under head coach Don James, a western-themed horse and rider were present at all Dix Stadium games. The horse was an Arabian named Raffstar. Along with Grog, Raffstar and its rider were discontinued in 1974. In 1977, another golden retriever became the mascot, this time named Mac the Flash. The dog held the mascot job until 1979. In 1981 through 1983, the mascot went by many different names, including Freddie Flash, Golden Flash, Flashman, and Captain Flash. All of them were costumed people featuring lightning bolts.

References

External links